Bytharia is a genus of moths in the family Geometridae erected by Francis Walker in 1865. The species which are relatively large for subfamily Sterrhinae and are characterized by pale yellow wings with uniform gray margins and, on the forewing, gray along the costa.

Species
Bytharia angusticincta Prout, 1920	
Bytharia atrimargo Warren, 1896	
Bytharia baletensis Schultze, 1925	
Bytharia circumdata Swinhoe, 1902	
Bytharia circumducta Pagenstecher, 1900                     	
Bytharia latimargo Warren	
Bytharia lucida Warren, 1899	
Bytharia marginata Walker, 1864	
Bytharia uniformis Swinhoe, 1902

References

Sterrhinae
Cosymbiini
Geometridae genera